The Duchy of Spoleto was a Lombard territory founded about 570 in central Italy by the Lombard dux Faroald. Its capital was the city of Spoleto.

Lombards 
The Lombards had invaded Italy in 568 AD and conquered much of it, establishing the Kingdom of the Lombards, which was divided among several dukes dependent on the King. The King himself had established his seat in Pavia in 572. In the following years they also conquered much of southern and central Italy, conquering the important hub of Spoleto, in what is now Umbria, in 570.

A decade of interregnum after the death of Alboin's successor (574), however, left the Lombard dukes (especially the southern ones) well settled in their new territories and quite independent of the Lombard kings at Pavia. By 575 or 576 Faroald had seized Nursia and Spoleto, establishing his duchy and sponsoring an Arian bishop. Within Spoleto, the Roman capitolium dedicated to Jupiter, Juno and Minerva had already been occupied by the bishop's cathedral (the see was founded in the 4th century) which incorporated the pagan structure (now the church of San Ansano). The Lombard dukes restored the fortifications of the high rocca, whose walls had been dismantled by Totila during the Gothic War.

The dukes of Spoleto waged intermittent war with the Byzantine Exarchate of Ravenna, and Spoleto's territories fluctuated with the fortunes of the times over much of Umbria, Lazio, the Marche and the Abruzzi. Never as important as the Duchy of Benevento, Spoleto has a fairly obscure spot in Lombard history, nevertheless. Its second Duke Ariulf made frequent expeditions against the Byzantines (in 579–592 against Ravenna and in 592 against Rome). Ariulf was succeeded by Theudelapius, son of Faroald, whom the Catholic Encyclopedia credits with the first building of Spoleto's cathedral. Then came Atto (653), Thrasimund I (663), and Faroald II (703), who ruled conjointly with his brother Wachilap. Faroald II captured Classis, the port of Ravenna, according to Paul the Deacon's History of the Lombards: "In that time too Faroald, the first dux of the Spoletans, invading Classis with an army of Lombards, left the wealthy city despoiled and bare of all its riches." He was then obliged by Liutprand, King of the Lombards to restore it, a measure of the loose central control of Lombard rule that Liutprand was occupied in tightening, at least as Paul interpreted events for his Frankish patrons. At Spoleto Faroald was deposed by his son Transemund II (724), who also rebelled against Liutprand and formed an alliance with Pope Gregory III, who sheltered him in Rome in 738. Ilderic, who had replaced him as duke, was slain by Transemund in 740, but in 742 Transemund was forcibly retired to a monastery by Liutprand, who conferred the duchy that he had rewon by force of arms upon Agiprand (742). By the time of Liutprand's death (744), Spoleto was more securely in central control from Pavia, and Theodicus succeeded peaceably. Three 8th-century dukes were Kings of the Lombards, a sign that in that period Spoleto was linked more closely to the kingdom than was Benevento.

Imperial fief 
In 776, two years after the fall of Pavia, Spoleto fell likewise to Charlemagne and his Carolingian Empire, and he assumed the title King of the Lombards. Though he granted the territory to the Church, he retained the right to name its dukes, an important concession that can be compared to the as-yet uncontested Imperial right to invest territorial bishops, and perhaps at times a matter of contention between emperor and papacy, for Pope Adrian I had recently named a duke of Spoleto.

In 842, the former duchy was resurrected by the Franks to be held as a Frankish border territory by a dependent margrave. Among the more outstanding of the Frankish dukes, Guy I divided the duchy between his two sons Lambert and Guy II, who received as his share the lordship of Camerino, which was made a duchy. Lambert was a doughty fighter against Saracen raiders, but who equally massacred Byzantines (as in 867), and was deposed in 871, restored in 876, and finally excommunicated by Pope John VIII. In 883 Guy II reunited the dukedom, henceforth as the Duchy of Spoleto and Camerino. After the death of Charles the Fat in 888, Guy had himself crowned emperor of the Romans and king of Italy by Pope Stephen V (891). The following year Pope Formosus crowned Guy's son Lambert II as duke, king and emperor.

The dukes of Spoleto continued to intervene in the violent politics of Rome. Alberico I, Duke of Camerino (897), and afterwards of Spoleto, married the notorious Roman noblewoman Marozia, mistress of Pope Sergius III (904–911), and was killed by the Romans in 924. His son Alberico II overthrew the senatrix in 932 though her son, his half-brother, was Pope John XII. About 949 the Frankish King Berengar II of Italy retook Spoleto from its final margrave.

At that time, Emperor Otto I detached from the Duchy of Spoleto the lands called Sabina Langobardica and presented them to the Holy See. Now the control of Spoleto became increasingly a gift of the emperors. In 967, Otto briefly united the Duchy of Spoleto with that of Principality of Capua and Benevento, which was then ruled by Pandulf Ironhead. After Pandolf's death in 981, the joint principality of Spoleto, Capua and Benevento is partitioned amongst the sons of Pandulf, who fight endlessly to gain supremacy. Landulf IV gains Spoleto, Capua, and Benevento, while Pandulf II receives Salerno. Then in 989 Otto III detached Spoleto and granted it to Hugh, Margrave of Tuscany. Later in December 998, Otto appointed Adhemar of Capua as the duke of Spoleto. Adhemar ruled four years until the duchy is united a second time with Tuscany in 1003.

During the Investiture Controversy with the papacy, Emperor Henry IV named other dukes of Spoleto. In 1152, the emperor gave the duchy to Guelf VI of Este. The city was destroyed by Emperor Frederick Barbarossa three years later, but was soon rebuilt. After that, the dukedom was held by the family of the Werner (Guarnieri) of Urslingen, margraves of Ancona. In 1183, Frederick appointed Conrad of Urslingen as the duke. Conrad ruled until 1190 when Frederick died and the Guelphs seized the principality and positioned Pandulf as the duke. Five years later after Henry VI succeeded Frederick I as emperor, Conrad regained the position as duke of Spoleto. After Henry VI died in 1197 and Otto of Brunswick became the king of Italy in 1198, however, Conrad left the position and ceded Spoleto to Pope Innocent III.

Papal fief 
In 1201, in support of Pope Innocent's desire to strengthen the dominion of the Papal States, Otto made a gift of the Imperial rights for Spoleto to the Papacy. In 1209, after the death of Philip of Swabia, however, Otto became the Holy Roman Emperor and reneged on his earlier promises to support the Pope. Otto set his sights on reestablishing Imperial power and occupied Spoleto until 1213 when the duchy was brought back under papal rule with a governor, usually a cardinal. However, Spoleto remained a pawn in the struggles of Frederick II until the extinction of the House of Hohenstaufen in 1254.

Ultimately, the territories of Spoleto were annexed to the Papal States and the Kingdom of Naples. The title of Duchy of Spoleto was later used by members of the House of Savoy.

See also 
Duke of Spoleto

Citations

References

External links 
 The History Files: Lombard Dukes of Spoleto.
 Spoleto on the Catholic Encyclopedia, showing a somewhat different list of dukes, working no doubt from the Liber Pontificalis

 
1201 disestablishments in Europe
13th-century disestablishments in Italy
Kingdom of Italy (Holy Roman Empire)
History of Catholicism in Italy
States and territories established in the 570s
570 establishments
Spoleto
States and territories established in the 840s
Lombards
842 establishments
Duchies of the Holy Roman Empire
Former duchies
Former monarchies of Europe